Of Skin and Men is a 2017 Franco–Tunisian romantic drama film directed by Mehdi Ben Attia and co-produced by David Mathieu-Mahias and Mani Mortazavi. The film stars Hafsia Herzi with Raouf Ben Amor, Haythem Achour, and Sondos Belhassen in supporting roles. The film follows the tale of young Amel who tries to find some consolation in photography after the sudden death of her husband, by selecting strangers from the streets.

The film was shot in Tunis, Tunisia. The film made its premier on 21 February 2018 in France. The film received mixed reviews from critics. In 2017 at the Warsaw International Film Festival, the film was nominated for the Grand Prix award for the International Competition.

Cast
 Hafsia Herzi as Amel
 Raouf Ben Amor as Taïeb, the father-in-law		
 Haythem Achour as Sami, Amel's intellectual lover		
 Sondos Belhassen as Souad, Taïeb's wife		
 Karim Ait M'Hand as Rabah, a young plebeen photographed by Amel
 Oumayma Ben Hafsia as Kaouther
 Rochdi Belgasmi as Aïssa, Kaouther's boyfriend
 Abdelhamid Nawara	as Mouldi, hairdresser photographed by Amel
 Nasreddine Ben Maati as Kaïs
 Férid Boughedir as Moustapha
 Nawel Ben Kraiem	as Lilia
 Ghanem Zrelli	
 Samia Rhaiem 		
 Djaouida Vaughan

References

External links 
 

2017 films
2017 romantic drama films
Tunisian drama films